The Rev. William J. O'Malley, S.J. (born August 18, 1931) is an American author and actor. He was born in Buffalo, New York and attended Canisius High School there. He graduated from the College of the Holy Cross in 1953.

Life
O'Malley taught Advanced Placement (AP) English and theology for 22 years at McQuaid Jesuit High School in Rochester, New York. He also directed the school's musical and drama productions.

He taught theology, AP English and later an elective called The Problem of God/Morality/Marriage/Fatherhood at Fordham Preparatory School in the Bronx until June 2012.  He was an adjunct professor in the School of Professional and Continuing Studies at Fordham University until 2003, and later a professor of theology and the humanities at Seattle University.

O'Malley is best known for his portrayal of Father Dyer in The Exorcist, for which he was also a technical advisor. According to one source, he was the first Catholic priest to portray a priest in a commercial motion picture. He has also appeared in the E! True Hollywood Story of the Curse of The Exorcist.  He has directed 99 plays and musicals with students and adults.

As an author, O'Malley has written 37 published books, including Choosing to Be Catholic, Why Be Catholic?, God: The Oldest Question, Meeting the Living God, Building Your Own Conscience, and The Fifth Week.  His book, Help My Unbelief, won a Catholic Book Award in 2009. His book, You'll Never Be Younger: A Good News Spirituality for Those Over 60 won a Catholic Press Association Book Award in 2016.

On stage in Rochester he appeared as Jim, the gentleman caller, in a production of The Glass Menagerie at the Theater at the Tracks and as the cleric in the Rochester Community Players production of The Power and the Glory, by Graham Greene.

Awards and honorary degrees
In 1990, O'Malley received an honorary doctorate in humane letters from Le Moyne College. In 2007, he received the F. Sadlier Dinger Award from educational publisher William H. Sadlier, Inc. in recognition of his outstanding contributions to the ministry of religious education in America, for which he received three Best Article Awards from the Catholic Press Association.

References

External links

McQuaid Jesuit High School – O'Malley's Best

20th-century American Jesuits
21st-century American Jesuits
Fordham University faculty
Seattle University faculty
College of the Holy Cross alumni
1931 births
Living people
American male writers
Jesuit theologians